Hemibagrus is a genus of catfishes (order Siluriformes) of the family Bagridae.

The genus Hemibagrus is known from Southeast Asia, India, and southern China. Members of this genus are found ubiquitously in river drainages east of the Ganges-Brahmaputra basin and south of the Yangtze basin, and reach their greatest diversity in Sundaland.

This genus consists of large-sized catfishes. H. wyckioides is the largest Bagrid catfish in central Indochina and may reach 80 kilograms. It includes species with depressed (flattened) heads, rugose (ridged or wrinkled) head shields not covered by skin, and moderately long adipose fins.

In Southeast Asia, Hemibagrus species are an important source of animal protein.

The extinct species, H. major, is a fossil species from a Miocene lake fauna from what is now Ban Nong Pia, Phetchabun Province of Thailand.

Species 
There are currently 41 recognized species in this genus:
 Hemibagrus amemiyai (Sh. Kimura, 1934)
 Hemibagrus baramensis (Regan, 1906)
 Hemibagrus bongan (Popta, 1904)
 Hemibagrus camthuyensis V. H. Nguyễn, 2005
 Hemibagrus caveatus H. H. Ng, Wirjoatmodjo & Hadiaty, 2001
 Hemibagrus centralus Đ. Y. Mai, 1978
 Hemibagrus chiemhoaensis V. H. Nguyễn, 2005
 Hemibagrus chrysops H. H. Ng & Dodson, 1999
 Hemibagrus divaricatus H. H. Ng & Kottelat, 2013
 Hemibagrus dongbacensis V. H. Nguyễn, 2005
 Hemibagrus filamentus (P. W. Fang & Chaux, 1949)
 Hemibagrus fortis (Popta, 1904)
 Hemibagrus furcatus H. H. Ng, Martin-Smith & P. K. L. Ng, 2000
 Hemibagrus gracilis P. K. L. Ng & H. H. Ng, 1995
 Hemibagrus guttatus (Lacépède, 1803)
 Hemibagrus hainanensis (T. L. Tchang, 1935)
 Hemibagrus hoevenii (Bleeker, 1846)
 Hemibagrus hongus Đ. Y. Mai, 1978
 Hemibagrus imbrifer H. H. Ng & Ferraris, 2000
 Hemibagrus johorensis (Herre, 1940)
 Hemibagrus lacustrinus H. H. Ng & Kottelat, 2013
 Hemibagrus macropterus Bleeker, 1870
 Hemibagrus maydelli (Rössel, 1964)
 Hemibagrus menoda (F. Hamilton, 1822) (Menoda catfish)
 Hemibagrus microphthalmus (F. Day, 1877)
 Hemibagrus nemurus (Valenciennes, 1840) (Yellow catfish)
 Hemibagrus olyroides (T. R. Roberts, 1989)
 Hemibagrus peguensis (Boulenger, 1894)
 Hemibagrus planiceps (Valenciennes, 1840)
 Hemibagrus pluriradiatus (Vaillant, 1892)
 Hemibagrus punctatus (Jerdon, 1849)
 Hemibagrus sabanus (Inger & P. K. Chin, 1959)
 Hemibagrus semotus H. H. Ng & Kottelat, 2013
 Hemibagrus songdaensis V. H. Nguyễn, 2005
 Hemibagrus spilopterus H. H. Ng & Rainboth, 1999
 Hemibagrus taybacensis V. H. Nguyễn, 2005
 Hemibagrus variegatus H. H. Ng & Ferraris, 2000
 Hemibagrus velox H. H. Tan & H. H. Ng, 2000
 Hemibagrus vietnamicus Đ. Y. Mai, 1978
 Hemibagrus wyckii (Bleeker, 1858)
 Hemibagrus wyckioides (P. W. Fang & Chaux, 1949)

References

External links

Bagridae
Fish of Asia
Catfish genera
Taxa named by Pieter Bleeker